The defense industry of South Korea is the main supplier of armaments to the Republic of Korea Armed Forces. Originally reliant on the United States to supply weapons to its armed forces, South Korea evolved to manufacture its own weapons through the country's modernization and military reforms. Due to this transformation South Korea has developed its own robust defense industry and exports its products to many other nations. South Korea is one of the leading suppliers in the global arms market and is currently the 8th largest defense exporter.

History

Background 
Following South Korea's liberation from Japan on 15 August 1945, the Republic of Korea established its first independent government on 15 August 1948, along with its own armed forces. However, the ROK military was largely unprepared and ill-equipped to fight as they lacked numbers, training, heavy weapons and large support from the United States. Comparatively, North Korea had the numbers advantage and enjoyed a large amount of support from China and the Soviet Union in the form of rigorous training, man power, military organization, and large supply of various weapons. This would prove devastating in the beginning of the Korean War as the ROK military was pushed to the brink of defeat until US-led forces intervened in the war. The experience in the war facilitated the need for the ROK military to be better equipped, trained and supported but economic underdevelopment and instability prevented South Korea from developing its own defense industry; forcing the country to continue its security dependency on the US until the late 1960s.

Under the Third and Fourth Republic of Korea 

In 1969, President Richard Nixon's announced that as part of his Nixon Doctrine the United States would begin to reduce its military presence in Asia and allow its Asian allies to be in-charge of their own security. The result of decreasing American commitment, combined with fresh memories of North Korean military provocations, forced South Korea to become self-reliant.

The 1970s would mark the beginning of South Korea's defense industry when President Park Chung-hee implemented military reforms to modernize the military and kick start South Korea's domestic defense industry. Concurrently, President Park also implement reforms and policies to industrialize South Korea to achieve massive economic growth. Basing off the Second Republic's (planned) five-year economic plan, President Park would initiate his own Five-Year Plans, as well as normalize relations with Japan in 1965 and maintain close ties with the US to receive the much needed economic aid to accomplish his goals. By the Third Five Year Plan (1972–1976) South Korea would commit to investing and develop its own heavy and chemical industries to achieve independent defense industrialization. This can be seen in 1973 with the enactment of the Heavy and Chemical Industry (HCI) Development Plan. This economic plan aimed to switch South Korea's production from light manufacturing to heavy and chemical industries; focusing on shipbuilding, automobiles, steel products, machinery, non-ferrous metals, textiles and petrochemicals. This HCI plan was partially motivated by security tensions stemming from the partial withdrawal of US troops in South Korea. Several military reforms were established to help the defense industry: instrumental of these included the creation of the Agency for Defense Development (ADD) in 1970 and the Special Law on the Promotion of the Defense Industry, National Investment Fund and Yulgok Plan in 1974.

The ADD primarily helped streamline research and development, as well as acquire foreign military technologies and directly engage in product development. The first weapon that South Korea would produce on its own (albeit with restriction) are licensed Colt M16 rifles in 1971. Other US-designed weapons and ammunition would later be produced under license in the mid-1970's. Between 1977 and 1984 defense contractors would also begin to reverse engineer US-made weapons to help research and develop their own domestic weapons. The Special Law on the Promotion of the Defense Industry encouraged private firms to participate in the defense industry by providing many incentives to join. These incentives include: government financing, preferential financial agreements, reduced taxes and tariffs, concession of plant sites, administrative support, exemption of military draft for skilled employees and government guarantee of corporate survival and rescue for companies who show signs of financial struggles. The National Investment Fund was established to provide financial resources to the nation's growing heavy and chemical industries. It later evolved into the Defense Industrial Promotion Fund in 1980 (until its dissolution in 2006) to allocate resources directly to the defense industry. Yulgok Plan was launched to design South Korea's military strategies and build up combat capabilities independently from the US. To accomplish these goals indigenous arms production were prioritized by encouraging local production and procurement for its military.

President Park's intermingling of economic and defense policy were very successful as the South Korean military and defense industry benefited greatly from the country's rapid economic growth and industrialization.By the time of the Fourth Five Year Plan (1977–1981) South Korea's defense industry has been diversified throughout other industries: such as heavy industries, electronics and shipbuilding. As the other industries experienced massive investments and development, the defense industry would also experience it as well.  One industry that stood out and achieved overwhelming success is the country's shipbuilding industry. Capitalizing on the country's massively developed shipbuilding capabilities South Korea would develop one of its earliest and successfully produced warship, the Chamsuri-class patrol boat, during the 1970s.

However, the defense industry would soon experience problems arise from its own rapid development. As the country was under a military dictatorship at the time, policies and decision makings related to the defense industry was highly centralized under President Park and his technocrats in the Blue House, especially O Wonchol. As a result, decisions that were made were implemented quickly without public input and participation, including those who are involved in the defense industry. The consequences of having those decisions be made in absence of effective planning and coordination was eventually experienced in the form of inefficiency, redundancy and over-saturation in the defense industry. The market became overcrowded with manufacturers competing with each other to excessively manufacture every type of component in-order to acquire a larger share of the arms market; preventing the South Korean defense industry from reaping the benefits of higher quality and economies of scale that come from specialization.

Under the Fifth Republic of Korea 
Following the assassination of Park Chung-hee in 1979, South Korea experienced economic difficulties, as well as political and social turmoil, following its transition from the Forth Republic to the Fifth. In the late 1970s, internal economic problems emerged from South Korea's rapid development due to the over emphasis on the heavy and chemical industries; in particular the defense industry connected to both industries. Under Park Chung-hee's administration the heavy and chemical industry was heavily invested with the aim to develop their home-grown defense industry and modernize the military. So much has been invested that the levels of investment exceeded what was needed or could be provided. The lack of proper investment and planning lead to wasteful spending and inefficiencies within the industries and ultimately the economy began to experience an alarming increase in inflation rate. Combined with the 1979 oil crisis, underdeveloped agriculture sector, growing foreign debt among others, the needless heavy investment towards the defense industry contributed to the economic crisis between the late-1970's to the mid-1980's.

As a result of the economic, political and social crisis gripping South Korea in the early 1980s, President Chun Doo-hwan implemented reforms and changes to stabilize the country again. The Fifth Fiver Year Plan (1982–1986) shifted away the government's focus on the heavy and chemical industries and halted the unnecessary heavy investment in the defense industry that occurred in the past. Decisions and responsibilities related to the defense industry and weapons development now fell on the Ministry of National Defense (MND) and Ministry of Trade and Industry instead of the President. This change meant the defense industry would not receive the special treatment it used to get under Third and Forth Republic and its budget and prioritization subsequently decreased. President Chun would also establish the Korean Institute for Defense Analysis (modeled after the US Institute for Defense Analyses) in 1979 as a means to further plan and coordinate the defense industry with the government through the MND.

The 1980s would see a decline in the defense industry as a result of the changes occurring in within itself and the country. By the 1980s the defense industry has matured enough to produce basic weapons and equipment on its own, accomplishing the country's goal of becoming military self-sustaining. However, as a result of this accomplishment the development of the defense industry itself became static. Furthermore, the market size and demands for military products decreased since South Korea achieved its conventional weapons needs. The lack of new investment, profit and growth discouraged manufacturers from investing in the defense industry even with the government's promise of financial assistance. Soon, military production began to decrease; with some defense contractors even going bankrupt from this stagnation. Arms export in particular were acutely affected with a $975 million revenue in 1982 dropping to a mere $50 million in 1988.

Despite this, the shipbuilding sector would continue to produce indigenous warships throughout the 1980s: the Ulsan-class frigate, Donghae-class corvette and Ganggyeong (Swallow)-class minehunter based on the Italian Lerici-class minehunter.

Late 1980's – present 
Between the late 1980s to early 1990's South Korea would experience drastic changes from within and outside the country. In 1987, the country's political system would historically transition from a military dictatorship to a democratic government. The early 1990s would also see Germany reunified, the collapse of the Soviet Union and the subsequent end to the Cold War. As the threat of the Soviet military began to wane (and later end) the US began another phase of reduction of its military presence in East Asia. In response the newly elected President Roh Tae-woo would implement new rounds of military reforms called the "August 18 Plan" or "818 Plan" on 18 August 1988. The plan aims to further reduce South Korea's military dependence on the United States by further increasing self-reliance; "Koreanization of Korean defense" as Rho puts it. The defense industry would find itself reinvigorated as part of the 818 Plan includes restructuring the military and procuring new weapons. The plan desired the military to possess a balanced mix of highly advanced (albeit expensive) weapons and moderately priced conventional weapons. In addition, the air force and navy would increase and strengthen its assets to fill the gap the US military would leave behind.

In the late 1980s South Korean Navy would began pursuing the acquisition of larger submarines to supersede their 150-ton Dolgorae midget submarines in better protecting critical shipping lanes from North Korean submarines. The Jang Bogo-class submarine was later developed in the 1990s based on the German Type 209 submarine. In 1989, South Korea's aerospace industry would begin to become more proactive in the defense business. Seoul announced that it would develop the Korean Fighters Program with McDonnell Douglas (now merged with Boeing) to help domestically develop a supersonic fighter jet within two decades of the announcement. South Korea would select McDonnell Douglas F/A-18 Hornet to be co-produced, with Samsung Aerospace contracted to manufacture the engine and air-frame while LG Corporation was subcontracted to manufacture the avionics. The deal, however, fell through and the F-16 was later selected and built. Korean Air would also be contracted by the U.S. Air Force to handle maintenance of their fleet of F-4, F-15, A-10, and C-130 stationed in South Korea, Japan and the Philippines. In 1990, South Korea would produce new tanks, artillery and helicopters for its military. The K1 88-Tank would be developed by Hyundai Precision based on the XM1 tank (M1 Abrams prototype) as a successor to the country's inventory of M48 Patton. Samsung Techwin produced licensed built American M109 howitzer dubbed the K55. KIA Machine Tool manufactured the 105 mm KH-178 and 155 mm KH-179 towed howitzer. UH-60 helicopters would also be manufactured in South Korea by Samsung Aerospace. Around this time South Korea's defense industry is able to produce 70% of the country's military weapons, vehicles, equipment, ammunition and other necessities.

These efforts would be somewhat halted or slow downed when President Kim Young-sam was elected into office. To further do away with the military's influence on South Korea's politics, President Kim would begin to transition the military under civilian control and remove elements of authoritarian military influence; such as the dissolution of Hanahoe and the arrest of former presidents Chun Doo-hwan and Roh Tae-woo. As the military no longer held major influence as it did, innovation and changes for the military and defense industry became secondary priority.

South Korea's military advancements would resume under President Kim Dae-jung. On 15 April 1998, President Kim would establish the Committee for the Promotion of Defense Reform and the Five Year Defense Reform Plan. The Committee concluded that South Korea was in need of a more informational based and cutting-edge military along with restructuring to make it more effective and economical. Under this advisement Kim's government would begin promote the development and procurement of more advance weapons and assets across all branches of the military.

One 1 June 2005, President Roh Moo-hyun's administration would draft the Defense Reform 2020 to further establish a more technologically advanced military and sophisticated defense capability for the country. Part of the reform involves reducing the manpower of the military from 650,000 to 500,000 by 2020, but would procure new military assets to improve, develop and/or expand its operations as part of its restructuring. As such, the South Korean defense industry would experience a very large surge in developing and manufacturing new weapons and equipment to meet these demands. For example, since the army would be the primary branch to reduce the number of personnel new UAVs, tanks, artillery, infantry fighting vehicles and others weapons would be develop for them to offset the manpower reduction. The South Korean navy would also aim to become a blue water navy and thus new ships and submarines would be procured. Likewise, the air force would also desire to enhance its own capabilities by acquiring its own "high-low mix" of fighters (i.e. F-15K), attack helicopters, surface-to-air missiles, aerial refueling and airborne early warning and control aircraft. On 1 January 2006, the Defense Acquisition Program Administration (DAPA) was established to further enhance the administration of military projects and procurements.

Around 2010, amid rising Chinese militarization, resurgence of Russian military activities, and lowering of American security, countries from Southeast Asia and Europe would began to strengthen and rebuild their military by procuring new weapon systems. As a result, South Korea's defense industry would see a large surge of new customers and increased exports throughout the 2010s. South Korea would also implement reforms to increase the defense industry's competitiveness. The massive increase in manufacturing and exports resulted an unprecedented growth for South Korea's defense industry and military. Arms export revenue would rise to $3.2 billion in 2017 compared to $250 million in 2006. In 2018, South Korea became the 11th largest arms exporter in the world according to Stockholm International Peace Research Institute (SIPRI). South Korea's arms export from 2009 to 2013 to 2014–18 increased by 94 percent. Additionally, with the large growth obtained South Korea's military expenditure from 2009 to 2018 increased by 28 percent.

In July 2018, President Moon Jae-in introduced the Defense Reform 2.0, an improved version of the Defense Reform 2020 created in 2005. Part of the new reform placed great importance on supporting South Korea's defense industry and arms export; not only to grow the country's industry but to also become less dependent on foreign (mostly U.S.) defense technology. One of these efforts include the development of the KAI KF-X; while dependent on using American General Electric F414 engines, the avionics will be mostly of domestic origin. In January 2019, South Korea changed its defense offset policy to focus more on local production and export than technology transfer with foreign defense contractors. Arms export reportedly valued at $1.48 billion in 2019; a 11.5% decrease compared to 2018.

The COVID-19 pandemic, both internationally and in South Korea had an effect on the country's defense industry. Domestic financial and operational difficulties were incurred, as well as the decrease in arms exports. In response the South Korean government began to actively support domestic industries and implement changes to increase military exports.

The first measure implemented is strengthening coordination between ministries to support defense export and positioning several domestic purpose products for exports. One such domestic product pushed for export is the KAI KUH-1 Surion.

Second measure to curtail the financial losses experienced include the South Korean government spending more on domestic contracts. In mid-June 2020, Defense Minister Jeong Kyeong-doo met with CEO's of various contractors to discuss ways on adjusting to the COVID-19 pandemic. These adjustments includes increased government spending on domestic products, moving delivery timelines in light of possible schedule delays and waiving penalties because of these delays. These domestic defense contracts reportedly include: 20 KAI T-50 aircraft worth ₩688 billion or $570 million delivered from Korea Aerospace Industries (KAI) to the Republic of Korea Air Force, 60 KUH-1 Surion helicopters worth ₩1.3 trillion delivered from KAI to the Republic of Korea Army, K56 ammunition resupply vehicles worth ₩380.3 billion from Hanwha Defense, 30-mm self-propelled anti-aircraft guns (SPAAG) worth ₩251.7 billion from Hanwha Defense, maintenance, repair and operations (MRO) deals on K9 Thunder (₩194.3 billion) and Chunma short-range surface-to-air missiles (₩238.3 billion) from Hanwha Defense, sales of K105A1 self-propelled howitzers and MRO deals on assault amphibious vehicles from Hanwha Defense to the Republic of Korea Marine Corps, combat engineering vehicles worth ₩236.6 billion from Hyundai Rotem, depot maintenance deal worth ₩63.2 billion on armored recovery vehicles and armoured vehicle-launched bridges from Hyundai Rotem. With regards to Hanwha Defense, it is reported that the defense company is performing very well despite the pandemic. The company secured ₩1.2 trillion or $1 billion worth of contracts within the first half of 2020 and expects to secure another ₩1 trillion worth of contracts within the second half.

A third effort is to boost support for local supply-chain by promoting and developing domestic substitutions of imported products or components. In April 2020, the MND invested $37 million to establish a "defense industry innovation cluster" in the city of Changwon; with the goal to launch several more "clusters" within the next few years. The purpose of these "clusters" is to support small enterprises in replacing imported components and systems; funding of which is directed to industry and research institutes to support regional research, development and production. Another program involves funding small to medium size enterprises to develop prototype components and/or subsystems to replace imported versions of the same parts. The funding program is to last for five years with a maximum funding of $8 million per project. Military products and/or programs supported by the import substitution include the KF-X fighter, KAI Light Armed Helicopter (LAH), active electronically scanned array (AESA) radar, guided air-to-surface missiles, future surface combatants, and local transmissions for the third phase production of the K2 Black Panther. A further boost to the import substitution program came on 15 September 2020, when DAPA and the Ministry of Trade, Industry and Energy (MOTIE) signed an agreement to collaborate on producing indigenous components for military platforms. Under the agreement the MOTIE allows greater access for local industries to participate in defense projects managed by DAPA. One such project is to develop locally built engines for K9 Thunders in replacement of German MTU engines.

Independently, South Korea's defense companies have enacted their own measures to adjust to the economic impact of COVID-19. For example, Hyundai Heavy Industries (HHI) announced it would merge its shipbuilding and offshore engineering divisions as part of a restructuring effort. HHI and Daewoo Shipbuilding & Marine Engineering (DSME) have reported that there production have remained largely unaffected by the pandemic.

Domestic development 

South Korea's defense industry initially produced copies or license produced variants of foreign weapons to meet the demands of its military. Through research and development and experienced gained from manufacturing foreign arms, South Korea developed the capability to produce its own basic arms and later more advance and sophisticated systems. According to Defense News Top 100 list for 2020, four of South Korea's defense companies were ranked in the top 100 defense companies of the world. These companies are Hanwha (32nd), Korea Aerospace Industries (55th), LIG Nex1 (68th), and Hyundai Rotem (95th).

Aerospace sector 

South Korea's initial experience with the aircraft industry involved maintenance of military aircraft in the 1950s, with improvements in maintenance capabilities occurring in the 1960s. The only company performing these maintenance duties was Korean Air, making it the first Korean aerospace company. Likewise, Korean Air would be the first company to produce aircraft and parts for South Korea. Their (and the country's) first major aerospace program occurred in 1976 by license producing MD 500 helicopters. Afterwards, in 1979, the country was allowed to license produce Northrop F-5 fighters. A combined total of 68 E and F models were produced by Korean Air between 1980 and 1986.

Samsung Aerospace (SSA) would become the second Korean company involved in the aerospace industry. SSA was originally specialized in manufacturing aircraft engines. This contrasted Korean Air who focused on aircraft assembly and maintenance. Both would become strong rivals who monopolized their own respective fields. This would change in 1984 under new government policy that would allow Daewoo Heavy Industries (DHI) and Hyundai Space and Aircraft (HYSA) to enter the aerospace industry. This was done to promote competition among the Korean conglomerates. Around this time, the dominance in South Korea's aerospace industry would begin to shift and active participation in the defense industry would arise. Korean Air would begin to lose its manufacturing edge as their experienced engineers begin to join SSA and DHI. HYSA would assemble BK 117 helicopters from Kawasaki Heavy Industries. However, this was considered an unprofitable venture as HYSA did not gain much technological assets or experience from it. SSA and DHI became emerging powers as well as rivals. This is primarily because both companies were competing to be awarded then South Korea's biggest aerospace project; license producing F-16 fighters for the South Korean air force's Korean Fighter Program (KFP). This is done to counter North Korean MiG-29s and Su-25s, as well as gain expertise in developing future fighter aircraft. In 1986, SSA was ultimately selected to cooperate with General Dynamics in co-producing F-16s between 1996 and 2000. This decision would solidify SSA's dominance in South Korea's aerospace industry. In addition, SSA would be tasked to develop the KTX-2 advanced trainer with Lockheed Martin based on the technology and experienced gained from the KFP. Moreover, in 1990, Samsung Aerospace would begin to license produce UH-60 helicopters for the South Korean Army. Meanwhile, Korean Air would be relegated to manufacturing helicopters and maintenance of US aircraft stationed in East Asia. DHI would be tasked to develop the KTX-1 basic trainer with ADD, gaining needed experience from it. HYSA was treading on thin ice; being unable to develop or acquire technologies or capabilities in manufacturing military aircraft, and were thus unable to secure government contracts. Instead, they focused on manufacturing wings and large airframes by participating in the MD-95 wing project, which itself was a difficult task for HSYA.

South Korea's capability to develop indigenous missiles originated from performing maintenance on MIM-23 Hawk and Nike Hercules missiles in 1972. The South Korean company in charge of the maintenance was GoldStar Precision. After gaining enough expertise, South Korea developed its first ballistic missile, the Hyunmoo-1, based on the Nike Hercules missiles. GoldStar Precision would later become LIG Nex1, which continues to develop advance missiles and equipment for the South Korean military. Additionally, South Korea would also modernize MGR-1 Honest John missiles.

After the Cold War, leading aircraft companies around the world have begone to consolidate in their countries, merging and acquiring with others to lower development cost and risks amidst an era of uncertainty in the aircraft market. Leading aircraft companies would also begin to cooperate with each other to develop new aircraft for economical reasons. The 1997 Asian financial crisis forced South Korea to consolidate its aerospace industry for the same reasons. The rivalry between the aircraft companies reduced their competitiveness and the South Korean government was in desperate need of a more streamlined aerospace manufacturer for the country. The decision was made to merge SSA, DHI, and HYSA under a single entity. Korean Air opted not to join, but by that point was not heavily involved in manufacturing aircraft as it used to. On October 1, 1999, all three aircraft companies merged to become Korea Aerospace Industry (KAI); South Korea's sole aircraft manufacturer. KAI inherited the aircraft programs the previous companies were working on, as well as embarking on several projects to develop aircraft domestically for the armed forces. KAI produced the KT-1 basic trainer from DHI's work on the KTX-1 program. KAI would cooperate with Lockheed Martin to produce addition F-16s for the KFP. In the early 2000s, KAI successfully developed the T-50 advanced trainer from SSA's work on the KTX-2 program. The T-50 is South Korea's first domestically produced supersonic aircraft and has been widely produced and exported. It is considered one of the most advanced trainer aircraft and the FA-50 variant has been made as a light combat aircraft. At the same time, the F-15K would be selected fighter of the F-X fighter program, leading to its co-production between KAI and Boeing. The KUH-1 and LAH helicopters were co-developed with assistance from Airbus Helicopters (formerly called Eurocopter). The KF-X fighter is South Korea's second domestically produced fighter, with the goal of becoming an advance multi-role fighter to replace South Korea's aging F-4 and F-5 fighters and potentially becoming exportable. In 2015, KAI was awarded the contract by DAPA to develop the KF-X. The aircraft's development is planned to be completed by 2026, with mass production beginning in 2028. KAI would also develop UAVs a various sizes and purposes for military and civilian usages.

In late 2020, KAI announced it would begin to develop military transport aircraft, allowing South Korea to enter the military transport market.

Shipbuilding 

The South Korean Navy was formed as a Green-water navy designed to counter North Korean insurgent operations. As such, early warship productions involved manufacturing high-speed patrol boats to guard South Korea's coast. In 1972, South Korea made its first patrol boat, the Haksaeng-class patrol boat (renamed and donated to the Philippines as Conrado Yap-class patrol craft). The first shipbuilding companies involved in manufacturing warships were Korea Shipbuilding & Engineering Corp. (KSEC) and Korea Tacoma Marine Industries Ltd., both of which produced many of South Korea's earliest warships, such as the aforementioned Haksaeng-class and Chamsuri-class patrol boats. Later, Hyundai Heavy Industries (HHI) and Daewoo Shipbuilding & Marine Engineering (DSME) (under Daewoo Group until 1999) would join in producing warships. All four companies cooperated with each other in producing corvettes and frigates during the 1980s to bolster South Korea's anti-submarine warfare capabilities. In 1989, KSEC would rename into Hanjin Heavy Industries Co. Ltd. (HHIC) and acquired Korea Tacoma in 1999.

As South Korea's shipbuilding industry grew, so did its desire and capabilities to build larger and more advance warships. South Korea's shipbuilding is the largest in the world, possessing some of the largest and most advanced shipyards, with the shipbuilding industry accounting for 6.5 percent of the country's GDP. South Korea's expertise in shipbuilding gives it an advantage in constructing larger warships; having the infrastructures, technologies, and skills necessary to construct warships. From the 1990s, South Korea began to construct larger ships and submarines to enhance its navy; and by the 2000s the country begin to pursue its desire to establish a Blue-water navy. Part of this desire is to match against China and Japan's growing naval development and capabilities, as South Korea has territorial disputes with both countries. HHI, DSME, and HHIC would play a big role in manufacturing larger, more advanced warships under various programs to meet this realization. Two very important programs are the Korean Destroyer eXperimental (KDX) program and the Korean Attack Submarine program, both of which aim to develop larger and more capable destroyers and submarines under different phases for South Korea's growing navy.

The destroyer program was originally divided into three phases. The first phase led to the creation of the KDX-1 (Gwanggaeto the Great-class destroyer) in the late 1990s. Between the 2000s to early-2010s, South Korea developed six KDX-II (Chungmugong Yi Sun-sin-class destroyer) and three KDX-III (Sejong the Great-class destroyers). The KDX-II offered greater capabilities than the KDX-1, while the KDX-III is the largest Aegis equipped vessel in the world, although it is not outfitted to for ballistic missile defence. Both class of destroyers enhances the ROK Navy's offensive and defensive capabilities. South Korea announced it would construct six more variants of the KDX-II destroyer, designated as KDX-IIA. The KDX-IIA is said to be larger than the KDX-II, equipped with aegis combat system, and would possibly be exported to other countries.

The submarine program is also divided into three phases: the KSS-I, KSS-II, and KSS-III. The first two classes of submarines were made with assistance from German naval firm Howaldtswerke-Deutsche Werft. The KSS-I (Jang Bogo-class) is a licensed produced variant of the Germany's Type 209 submarine. The KSS-II (Type 214 submarine) is also licensed produced from Germany. The KSS-II offered greater technology, such as Air-independent propulsion (AIP), and more involvement for South Korean companies during its construction. Unlike the first two class, the KSS-III (Dosan Ahn Changho-class) is of indigenous design. The KSS-III is larger and heavier than its predecessors and will offer greater improvements and capabilities: such as having vertical launching system for cruise or ballistic missiles and introducing lithium-ion batteries for greater underwater endurance. A total of nine KSS-III submarines are planned to be produced between three batches, each with three submarines. The second batch of KSS-IIIs will be large than the first batch to accommodate additional VLS, more South Korean technologies, and will be the first South Korean submarines to use lithium-ion batteries. The last batch of KSS-IIIs is described to be even more advanced than the other batches and is rumored to be nuclear powered.

Another program introduced is the Future Frigate eXperimental (FFX) program, the goal of which is to develop a new, advanced frigates to replace the Pohang-class corvettes and Ulsan-class frigates. This led to the creation of the Incheon-class frigate in 2011 and subsequently the Daegu-class frigate (FFG-II) in 2016 and a planned FFG-III frigate. A combined total of 12–30 frigates are planned to be created from all three classes. The Yoon Youngha-class patrol vessel would be produced to replace the ageing Chamsuri-class patrol boats. South Korea would also develop amphibious warfare ships, such as the Cheon Wang Bong-class LST and Dokdo-class amphibious assault ship. The Dokdo-class in particular is said to be the center piece of South Korea's strategic mobile fleets, acting as the flagship.

On 30 April 2019, DAPA announced that the construction of a second batch of three Sejong the Great-class destroyers and Dosan Ahn Changho-class submarines. The two projects are worth a total of ₩7.3 trillion ($6.3 billion), with construction of the ships completing within the late 2020s and offering a number of improvements over the first batch of ships. Second batch of Sejong the Great destroyers will have the ability to intercept ballistic missiles. On 14 August 2019, South Korea announced plans to produce a 30,000-ton light aircraft carrier (LPX-II) as part of its five-year defense plan between 2020 and 2024. In October 2019, HHI was awarded the contract to build the LPX-II. On 29 May 2020, DAPA started a bidding process to develop a future class of six destroyers dubbed the KDDX. The KDDX program aims to develop an "Original Korean Destroyer" using advance domestic technologies. The design of the KDDX is expected to be completed by 2023 and will be constructed starting in 2024. HHI and DSME are competing to be selected to develop the future destroyer. Similarly, six FFG-III frigates will be constructed with the initial batch being completed by 2024.

Ground forces 
Most of South Korea's domestic weapons are produced for its ground forces, as its military is primarily designed to fight a potential North Korean land invasion. In the beginning, South Korea fielded US-made weapons and vehicles, such as the M16 rifles, M48 tanks, and M113 APC. The earliest programs for vehicles involved maintaining and upgrading these vehicles with assistance from the US.

Between the 1970s–1980s, South Korea embarked on domestically developing many conventional weapons and equipment for its ground forces. In 1976, South Korea licensed produced KM900 from Italy and later developed K200 KIFV. After being denied acquisition of the M60 tank, South Korea embarked on its first domestic tank development in 1980. Under supervision from General Dynamics Land Systems, Hyundai Precision (now Hyundai Rotem) would develop the XK1 prototype based on the M1 Abrams prototype, XM1. The prototype would be delivered and tested in 1984; followed by mass production in 1985. The tank was finally reveled to the public in 1987 and would officially enter service in 1988 under the designation K1 88-tank. Similarly in the 1980s, Samsung Techwin (now Hanwha Techwin) would develop indigenous artillery systems based on US designed artilleries. These include the K55, KH-178, and KH-179. The success and experience gained from these designs would lead to the development of the K9 Thunder beginning in 1989. Daewoo Precision Industries (now S&T Motiv) would also develop domestic firearms for the ground forces: K1, K2, K3, and K5. The K1 submachine gun alone would have 180,000 units produced and be exported by the time its successor has been announced.

Unmanned ground vehicle and other autonomous technologies have been developed for South Korea's ground forces. In mid-2020, South Korea announced the development of an unmanned K1 88-tank and K9 Thunder SPH.

Export 
South Korea is one of the largest arms exporter in the world; having successfully sold numerous advance military hardware to many countries. Between 2010 and 2014, South Korea exported its weapons to only seven countries, with more than half of the exports going to Turkey. Between 2015 and 2019, the number of countries purchasing South Korean military hardware increased to 17. This means by 2019, South Korea's exports grew by 143 percent, essentially more than doubling from the 2010–2014 period. Countries from Asia and Oceania accounted for 50 percent of South Korea's arms export, while 24 percent came from European countries and 17 percent from the Middle East. In 2018, South Korea was ranked as the 11th largest arms exporter in the world by SIPRI. The country's top three clients were Indonesia, Iraq, and the United Kingdom. In 2019, South Korea became the 10th largest arms exporter according to the same study conducted by SIPRI, making it the first time South Korea entered the top 10 list. The country's main clients in 2019 are still Indonesia, Iraq and the UK.

Aircraft 

The KAI T-50 is one of South Korea's most successfully exported weapons platform and has been credited for South Korea's increased arms export. Despite some failed bids, the T-50 has been exported to the Philippines, Iraq, Indonesia and Thailand; as well as a number of countries expressing interest in procuring the aircraft, such as Argentina. On 26 May 2019, KAI was contracted by the Royal Thai Air Force to upgrade the T-50TH for $50.6 million.

The KAI KUH-1 helicopter is being exported with assistance from Airbus. Armed variants have been showcased to attract customers from Southeast Asia, South America, and Africa who are in need of both utility and attack helicopters. The KUH-1 was further pushed for export to offset financial losses from the COVID-19 pandemic. Indonesia, Malaysia, Colombia, and Peru have expressed interest in purchasing the helicopter. KAI KT-1 Woongbi trainers have been exported to Indonesia, Turkey, Senegal, and Peru. Both the KUH-1 and the KT-1 aircraft are being offered to the Indian Air Force.

The KF-X fighter program is jointly financed with Indonesia. Indonesia is contributing 20 percent of the development cost; about ₩8.8 trillion or $7.3 billion.

Warships 
South Korea's shipbuilding sector is quite successful in exporting warships to other countries. The country's own expertise in shipbuilding makes it less reliant on foreign technologies, compared to its aircraft and ground vehicle production. This gives South Korea's shipbuilding an advantage as it can bypass export restrictions imposed from another country.

Indonesia purchased six Jang Bogo-class submarines from DSME; the first batch of three on 20 December 2011, for $1.1 billion and a second batch of three on 12 April 2019, for ₩1.16 trillion ($1.02 billion). These purchases made South Korea the fifth largest submarine exporter in the world at the time of the second deal. Similarly, DSME delivered the Bhumibol Adulyadej–class frigate, a modern variant of the Gwanggaeto the Great-class destroyer, to Thailand in December 2018. DSME have also manufactured the Tide-class tankers for the UK and Norway.

Hyundai Heavy Industries exported two Jose Rizal-class frigate, which are modified Incheon-class frigates, to the Philippines. The contract was awarded to HHI in October 2016 for $311 million. The lead ship was launched in Ulsan, South Korea on 23 May 2019. Sea trial occurred between 23 and 27 November 2019, and then delivered to the Philippines on 18 May 2020. The second ship was launched on 8 November 2019, in the same city. The delivery of both ships is considered extremely important to the Philippine Navy as the ships are modern frigates, which contrast to the old and ageing patrol ships that make up the majority of the Philippine fleet. HHI constructed HMNZS Aotearoa for the Royal New Zealand Navy for $327 million. The ship was launched on 25 April 2019, and underwent sea trials in December 2019. The ship was delivered to New Zealand in June 2020.

South Korea's DAE SUN Shipbuilding & Engineering Co., Ltd. developed the Makassar-class landing platform dock for the Indonesian Navy. The Philippines, Peru, and Myanmar also operate this class of ship.

In April 2017, South Korea signed an agreement with India to assist the country in making warships. The future KDX-IIA is planned to be exportable.

Ground vehicles/weapons 

The K9 Thunder is described as South Korea's most popular export and one of the most popular self-propelled howitzers in the world. This is due to its competitive performance and price range. The self-propelled artillery has been exported to Poland, India, Australia, Egypt, Norway etc. South Korea and Turkey co-developed the T-155 Fırtına based on the K9 Thunder. On 3 September 2020, Australia announced that 30 K9 Thunders and 15 K10 ammunition resupply vehicles would be purchased for ₩1 trillion ($843 million) as part of the country's Land 8116 Artillery Replacement project. The deal has been described as important because of Australia's affiliation as one of the Five Eyes would present a reputational boost to Hanwha Defense, and subsequently South Korea's defense industry. In October 2020, Hanwha Defense Australia released concept images of the Australian K9 and K10 vehicles, now named as Huntsman AS9 and AS10. Other countries interested in the K9 Thunder include Egypt, UAE, Saudi Arabia, Romania and UK.

The K2 Black Panther main battle tank is another land vehicle that is being exported. The tank has been sought in large quantities by Poland and Oman, as well as, co-developed with Turkey to produce the Altay tank. South Korea could sell 76 K2s to Oman in a deal worth up to $884.6 million. In September 2018, a desert variant of the K2 for Oman was unveiled in DX Korean Defense Exhibition. South Korea also proposed a joint production of 800 K2s to Poland. The K2s would replace Poland's inventory of T-72M1 and PT-91 Twardy main battle tanks. At the Polish defense exhibition, MSPO 2020, South Korea unveiled the Polish variant of the K2 tank, the K2PL.

A variant of the K21 called the AS21 Redback IFV has been proposed to the Australian Army for its Land 300 Phase 3 procurement program. The program is looking for 450 IFVs to replace Australia's M113AS4 APCs and is worth up to ₩5 trillion. The Redback and its competitor, Rheinmetall's Lynx KF41, were the final two candidates selected on 16 September 2019. On 26 July 2020, Hanwha Defense rolled out two Redback's to be delivered to Australia in August for testing. A third prototype was rolled out on 18 December 2020, and expected be delivered to Australia in mid-January 2021 to undergo testing.

Impact 
Former Commissioner of DAPA, Byun Moo-keun, describes the defense industry (in the past and present tense) as both an economic stimulant and technological innovation hub for South Korea because its economic contribution and its effect in other industries through research, development, and implementation of dual-use technology. In the past, South Korea's defense industry significantly contributed to South Korea's rapid industrialization under President Park Chung-hee. This was due to Park's policy of heavily investing the heavy-chemical industries for the sake of national security. As such, the defense industry has been diversified across other industries, which allowed investments and development to go both ways. The early successes of the industrialization attracted massive foreign capital investment. However, the over emphasis on developing the defense industry partially contributed to South Korea's economic crisis between the late-1970s to mid-1980s. In terms of overall economical contribution, the defense industry contributed about 1 percent of growth to the country's gross national product (GNP) between 1975 and 1989; although it could have arguably contributed more had the South Korean government not over emphasized it. However, the technological advances within the defense industry would also spill over to other sectors of the country, which in turn would increase the country's overall GNP.

Despite the problems, South Korea's defense industry played a role in improving the country's education. Since the defense industry initially lacked skilled workers, scientists, and engineers, the government took several measures to rectify this problem. The country recruited foreign engineers and, especially, Korean-born scientists and engineers living abroad, as well as send Korean students overseas to study. Large investments to education were made as new facilities and educational institutions were created to teach young Koreans various fields of engineering. While these efforts were made to get the skilled engineers and scientists for the defense industry, these well educated Koreans will also go on to improve the private sector and academic training institutions across the country.

The creation of the defense industry also paved a path for new employment opportunities. At the time of its creation, the country was looking to bolster its military, thus domestic production would be needed to meet the demands of the military. Combined with South Korea's large amount of military personnel, the defense industry would contribute to reducing unemployment. By 1982, unemployment rate was reduced to 4.4 percent. In 1987, the defense industry employed a little more than 35,000 individuals; 1.68 percent of the total employment in the manufacturing industry. Within the aerospace and industrial chemical sector, the defense industry would contribute between 8–9 percent of the total employment. This would mean that the defense industry contributed greatly to employment opportunities, as well as a production shift from conventional arms to more advanced weapon systems. By 2016, South Korea's defense industry reportedly employs 38,000 individuals.

Challenges 
One of the biggest challenges the South Korean defense industry face is its continuous dependency on foreign technologies. Although this issue has and is still being addressed, South Korea still struggles to develop some technologies domestically; forcing the country import what they can't develop in time. This can lead to delays and cost overruns, especially if South Korea can't acquire the components from another country. In April 2015, the US denied transfer of AESA radar, electro-optical targeting pod, infrared search and track systems, and radio frequency jammer to South Korea for their KF-X fighter program. This transfer refusal was kept secret until September when DAPA announced it, and reaffirmed in October during President Park Geun-hye's visit to the US. This was considered a major setback as it forced South Korea to develop the four key technologies on their own, increasing cost and delaying the KF-X project further. The tech transfer refusal also caused a stir amongst the South Korean public and government, not only because of DAPA's coverup, but also because it put into question about DAPA's selection of the F-35 in F-X III fighter program. It has been speculated that the F-35 was selected to acquire 25 key technologies needed for the KF-X; four of which are unobtainable.

Additionally, South Korea's endeavor to develop arms domestically has been mired with defects or lackluster results in many of its defense products. In 2010, 38 engines of 500 K9 Thunders have been damaged from faulty maintenance due to the usage of cheap antifreeze. The artillery's performance during the Bombardment of Yeonpyeong has been described as "disappointing" due to three of the six K9s being unable to fire back. The K21 IFV was redesigned following two incidents of it sinking during amphibious operations; one of the incident killed a soldier. The defects were revealed to be caused by a lack of buoyancy, malfunctioning of wave-plate, and problems with the drain pump. The K11 assault rifle has been found to be defective. This problem and cost overruns would continue until 2019, when the government recommended cancelling the K11 project entirely. In particular, South Korea has long struggled to develop domestic engines and transmission systems for its K2 tanks. The first batch of K2s (100 tanks) were originally meant to use a powerpack that uses a domestic engine and transmission system developed by Doosan Infracore and S&T Dynamics. However, reliability and durability problems in both components forced South Korea to import German powerpacks using MTU engines and Renk transmissions. This in turn delayed the K2's deployment until December 2013 in an attempt to fix the domestic powerpack, and then to March 2014 to ensure that the German powerpacks works. By the time of the second batch of K2s (106 tanks) the domestic engine has been produced. Unfortunately, South Korea's efforts to develop the domestic transmission system continued to struggle as it failed durability tests six times. As a result, the production of the second batch of K2s, which originally was to start in 2014, was delayed to 2018 with deployment occurring between 2019 and 2020. On 7 February 2018, DAPA announced it would continue to adopt the German Renk transmission system; effectively making the second batch of K2s operate on a hybrid powerpack consisting of South Korean made engine and German transmission. Although in mid-2020 DAPA announced its commitment to developing the local transmission system for the third batch of K2s (54 tanks), on 25 November, DAPA decided to continue to use the German Renk transmission system as the local transmission failed the durability test again. By the time of the 25 November announcement, South Korea has struggled to develop the domestic transmission system for 15 years. The third batch of K2s will follow the second batch in using the hybrid powerpack.

Moreover, the reliance on foreign components can also restrict South Korea's export since the country that developed the imported parts can prevent the export of the whole weapon system. In the past, the US Arms Export Control Act and International Traffic in Arms Regulations has hindered South Korea's arms export to Third World countries as South Korea's arms often made with US components. For Saudi Arabia and the UAE, Germany banned the export of the K9 Thunder to either countries due to the artillery using German engines. South Korea announced it would develop its own engines for the K9 to become more self-reliant and circumvent the export restriction imposed from another country. Similarly, Germany placed an arms embargo on Turkey, preventing the country from obtaining German MTU engines and Renk transmissions for its Altay tank, the same ones used for the K2 tanks. Turkey sought South Korea's aid to help recover the Altay program by using South Korean engine and transmission. This however raises concerns over the viability of that option as South Korea has failed to develop their transmission system. In October 2020, the UK barred South Korea from selling FA-50 aircraft to Argentina. The sale was prevented because of an existing arms embargo UK imposed on Argentina following the Falklands War. The FA-50 uses six parts of British origin. Argentina selected the FA-50 to replace their ageing A-4 Skyhawk and act as an interim replacement for the retired Mirage III fighters.

While South Korea's defense industry has greatly contributed to employment in the pass, it has been reported to create very little job opportunities in recent times. In 2017, the Korea Institute for Industrial Economics & Trade reported that in 2016 the defense industry accounts for only 0.9 percent of employment in South Korea's manufacturing industry despite receiving 10 percent of the government's budget. The job growth was 4.1 percent compared 23.9 percent in 2011. This is in stark contrast in comparison to Israel and the United States, who both spend similar percentages of their government budget to their national defense. For Israel and the US, their defense industries greatly contributes to job creations and the economy. The report warned that South Korea's neglect for domestic productivity in the defense industry can lead to a decline in technological innovation and industrial competitiveness.

Notes 
  The corvettes and frigates mentioned are the Donghae-class corvette, Pohang-class corvette, and Ulsan-class frigate.

References 

South Korea
Military industry in South Korea